Gurpreet Singh Wander (born 25 March 1960) is a cardiologist and academic based in Ludhiana, Punjab, India. He is currently working as the Institute a unit of the Dayanand Medical College and Hospital. He is the Chief Editor of The Yearbook of Medicine 2018 and The Progress in Medicine & Medicine Update 2016. He has also been an active contributor to the cardiology section of the popular API Textbook of Medicine (8th, 9th, 10th and 11th editions). He was awarded the Dr. B. C. Roy Award in 2006 for the Development of Specialties.

Early life
Wander was born on 25 March 1960 in Amritsar, Punjab to late Harjit Singh Wander who was a former professor and head of department at Government Medical College, Patiala. He pursued MBBS in 1981 followed by Doctorate of Medicine in Cardiology from Government Medical College, Patiala, Punjabi University in 1987.

Career 
Wander started his career by joining the faculty and the in-charge of the Dayanand Medical College at their Department of Medicine in 1988. He started the cardiology unit at Dayanand Medical College and Hospital in 1988.
Wander was elected as national president of the Association of Physicians of India (API).

Research 
Wander has published 120 papers, 45 of them in foreign journals of repute like The Lancet, Nature, Journal of Genetics, Journal of American College of Cardiology, The American Journal of Cardiology, British Heart Journal and Japanese Heart Journal. He has presented 115 papers at national and international conferences. He had conducted a few animal experiment studies on atherogenicity of oxidised cholesterol and a British collaborative study on coronary heart disease. He has been co-supervisor of post-graduation MD/MS thesis for Panjab University, Chandigarh and Baba Farid University, Faridkot, Punjab.

References

External links 

 Official website

Indian cardiologists
Scientists from Amritsar
Punjabi University alumni
Living people
1960 births
Indian medical academics